Les Mystères de l'amour (English Title: Love in Paris) is a French television series originally broadcast by TMC. It was created by Jean-Luc Azoulay. The original French title literally translates to The Mysteries of Love.

This is the third spin-off from the series Hélène et les Garçons, which ran from 1992–1994 and was followed by Le Miracle de l'amour (1994–1996), Les vacances de l'amour (1996–2004) and finally Les Mystères de l'amour (2011–present).

Plot

The series begins six years after the events of Les vacances de l'amour. The group of friends, now in their forties, have left Love Island after having lived there for many years and have returned to settle in Paris, the setting of the first series Hélène et les Garçons.

Everyone but Rudy thinks Jeanne died in a terrible plane crash and Nicolas is the only one who knows what has happened to Hélène. Nicolas, now a photographer, is living on a barge that is moored to the bank of the River Seine. He's in a relationship with Ingrid, the manager of a seedy bar. Bénédicte and José are managing a restaurant on Île de la Jatte. After rescuing his granddaughter, Olga has become Bénédicte's best friend. Christian has rejoined the group now that Johanna has returned to Texas. He is being financially supported by his young fiancee Angèle, while he pursues his dream of becoming a famous musician.

Cast
Information as of last episode of last ended season

Ended seasons: 30

Episodes

External links

References

2010s French drama television series
2020s French drama television series
2011 French television series debuts
French-language television shows
Television shows set in France
Television shows set in Paris
Television productions suspended due to the COVID-19 pandemic
TMC (TV channel) original programming